Ahmed Elbiali (born October 1, 1990) is an Egyptian-American professional boxer. He is managed by Al Haymon.

Elbiali earned an amateur record of 36-7, winning two Florida State Golden Gloves Championships and represented the Miami Gallos in the World Series of Boxing. Elbiali wanted to box for Egypt at the 2012 London Olympics however his efforts were cut short due to the Arab Spring and he was unable to compete in qualifying and he then turned professional.

Professional boxing record

| style="text-align:center;" colspan="9"|21 fights, 20 wins (17 knockouts), 1 losses, 0 draw
|-
|  style="border-style:none none solid solid; "| 
|align=center style="border-style: none none solid solid; background: #e3e3e3"|Res.
|align=center style="border-style: none none solid solid; background: #e3e3e3"|Record
|align=center style="border-style: none none solid solid; background: #e3e3e3"|Opponent
|align=center style="border-style: none none solid solid; background: #e3e3e3"|Type
|align=center style="border-style: none none solid solid; background: #e3e3e3"|Rd., Time
|align=center style="border-style: none none solid solid; background: #e3e3e3"|Date
|align=center style="border-style: none none solid solid; background: #e3e3e3"|Location
|align=center style="border-style: none none solid solid; background: #e3e3e3"|Notes
|- align=center
|21
|Win
|20-1
|style="text-align:left;"| Brian Vera
|TKO
|6 (10), 
|Dec 28, 2019
|style="text-align:left;"| 
|align=left|
|- align=center
|20
|Win
|19-1
|style="text-align:left;"| Marlos Eduardo Simoes
|TKO
|2 (10), 
|May 25, 2019
|style="text-align:left;"| 
|align=left|
|- align=center
|19
|Win
|18-1
|style="text-align:left;"| Allan Green
|KO
|3 (8), 
|Jan 13, 2019
|style="text-align:left;"| 
|align=left|
|- align=center
|18
|Win
|17-1
|style="text-align:left;"| Zoltan Sera
|KO
|3 (10), 
|Jun 10, 2018
|style="text-align:left;"| 
|align=left|
|- align=center
|17
|Loss
|16-1
|style="text-align:left;"| Jean Pascal
|TKO
|6 (10), 
|Dec 8, 2017
|style="text-align:left;"| 
|align=left|
|- align=center
|16
|Win
|16-0
|align=left| Andrew Hernandez
|UD
|8
|12 Jan 2016
|align=left|
|align=left|
|- align=center
|15
|Win
|15-0
|align=left| Mariano Hilario
|UD
|8
|13 Oct 2015
|align=left|
|align=left|
|- align=center
|14
|Win
|14-0
|align=left| Fabiano Pena
|KO
|1 (8), 
|08 Sep 2015
|align=left|
|align=left|
|- align=center
|13
|Win
|13-0
|align=left| Donta Woods
|KO
|1 (8), 
|13 Jun 2015
|align=left|
|align=left|
|- align=center
|12
|Win
|12-0
|align=left| Mike Stafford
|UD
|6
|26 Mar 2015
|align=left|
|align=left|
|- align=center
|11
|Win
|11-0
|align=left| Dustin Craig Echard
|TKO
|2 (6), 0:44
|06 Feb 2015
|align=left|
|align=left|
|- align=center
|10
|Win
|10-0
|align=left| Lawrence Blakey
|KO
|3 (4), 1:44
|11 Dec 2014
|align=left|
|align=left|
|- align=center

References

1990 births
Living people
Egyptian male boxers
Egyptian emigrants to the United States
Sportspeople from Cairo
Light-heavyweight boxers